Fakhrabad (also Romanized as Fakhrābād) is a village in Zirkuh Rural District, Central District, Zirkuh County, South Khorasan Province, Iran. At the 2006 census, its population was 214, in 57 families.

References 

Populated places in Zirkuh County